Voice of Silence is a 1953 French-Italian drama film directed by G. W. Pabst, written by Giuseppe Berto, starring Aldo Fabrizi and Jean Marais. The film's sets were designed by the art director Guido Fiorini. It was shot at the Cinecittà Studios in Rome, Italy.

Plot
A group of people, to try to make sense of their existence, retreats to a convent because each has problems considered insurmountable: a war veteran who is given up for dead returns from captivity in a sensational way and once home he finds his wife married and happy with another man; a partisan, during a war action, causes the death of three people; a votive candle dealer is too selfish to practice his trade. Then a writer famous for his production of works for adults arrive at the convent through which, according to many detractors, he corrupts many young minds, and a young priest who, dismayed by such a tumult of souls, is seized by mistrust regarding his vocation. At the end of the stay, everyone will leave, both those strengthened in their convictions and those who remain with their character and decide to continue their previous life.

Cast
 Aldo Fabrizi as Pio Fabiani
 Jean Marais as L'ancien maquisard
 Daniel Gélin as L'ancien prisonnier
 Cosetta Greco as Femme du prisonnier
 Franck Villard as L'écrivain
 Antonio Crast as Padre predicatore
 Eduardo Ciannelli as Padre superiore
 Paolo Panelli as Renato Santini
 Fernando Fernán Gómez as Fernando Layer
 Maria Grazia Francia as Pieta
 Checco Durante as Sacrestano
 Paolo Stoppa
 Rossana Podestà
 Enrico Luzi
 Franco Scandurra
 Pina Piovani

References

Bibliography
 Rentschler, Eric. The Films of G.W. Pabst: An Extraterritorial Cinema. Rutgers University Press, 1990.

External links
 
 La Conciencia acusa (1953) at the Films de France

1953 films
1953 drama films
1950s Italian-language films
Italian drama films
Italian black-and-white films
Films directed by G. W. Pabst
Films with screenplays by Roland Laudenbach
Films about Catholic priests
Films shot at Cinecittà Studios
Films scored by Enzo Masetti
French drama films
French black-and-white films
Lux Film films
1950s Italian films
1950s French films